Dinaran Rural District is in the Central District of Ardal County, Chaharmahal and Bakhtiari province, Iran. At the census of 2006, its population was 7,548 in 1,394 households; there were 6,800 inhabitants in 1,461 households at the following census of 2011; and in the most recent census of 2016, the population of the rural district was 5,890 in 1,432 households. The largest of its 37 villages was Lir Abi, with 1,189 people.

References 

Ardal County

Rural Districts of Chaharmahal and Bakhtiari Province

Populated places in Chaharmahal and Bakhtiari Province

Populated places in Ardal County